Alice Longyu Gao is a Chinese singer, songwriter, DJ, and performance artist currently based in New York City and Los Angeles. Their music has been noted for its "bold hyperpop" production. Their music has been featured on BBC Radio as "Tune of The Week," and "Women of Choice" by Lady Gaga on Apple Music.

History
Gao was born and raised in Bengbu, China. Gao moved to the United States at the age of 17 to attend Boston University for a B.S. in philosophy and completed Harvard University's Summer Program in Kyoto, Japan for Asian Religious Studies.

Gao started their art career by DJing events and soundtracking runway shows for Juicy Couture, Hennessy, M.A.C Cosmetics, MoMA, Parrish Art Museum, 1 OAK Tokyo, Nike, etc. As an editorial fashion producer and director, they produced and directed videos and shoots for publications such as V and Paper Magazine.  They also have done experiential art installation in collaboration with MOXY Time Square/Marriott International during NYFW.

Gao began releasing music independently in 2018 with early singles such as "Karma Is A Witch," and "Magnificroissant,".

In 2019, as the 2nd artist (after 100 Gecs) releasing on Dylan Brady's label Dog Show Records, Gao released the first set of many singles in collaboration with Brady "Rich Bitch Juice" and "Dumb bitch Juice" "Rich Bitch Juice" received critical acclaim from musical journalists and it was No.3 on Lady Gaga's  "Women of Choice" Apple Music playlist celebrating International Women's Day. Following the initial hype of the single Gao and Brady released a follow up remix compilation featuring Laura Les, Count Baldor, Blu Detiger and HANA. Since then Gao has released several solo singles as well as collaborative singles with Mura Masa, Bülow and Alice Glass.

Gao released their debut EP in 2021 titled High Dragon and Universe.

Activism 
Identifying as a pansexual queer, Gao has participated in multiple campaigns and charity events for the LGBTQ+ community. Alice was featured in W Hotels worldwide "Queer me out" campaign and the official NYC Pride campaign in 2017 & 2018. Both OUT and Posture Magazine featured Alice's strong artistic voice for the community. Gao has also deejayed for the It Gets Better Project featuring Hayley Kiyoko, Miz Cracker from Rupaul's Drag Race, as well as Patrick Starr's cosmetic collaboration launch event with M.A.C Cosmetics.

Discography

Extended plays

Singles

Footnotes

References

Musicians from Anhui
Living people
1994 births
Hyperpop musicians
Chinese LGBT singers
American LGBT people of Asian descent